Reinhild may refer to:

Reinhild, a saint of the 7th century
Reinhild,   a woman of the Middle Ages